The East India Company Military Seminary was a British military academy at Addiscombe, Surrey, in what is now the London Borough of Croydon. It opened in 1809 and closed in 1861. Its purpose was to train young officers to serve in the East India Company's own army in India.

The institution was formally known as the East India Company Military Seminary (a name the cadets always disliked) until 1855, when the name was changed to the East India Company Military College. In 1858, when the college was taken over by the government, it was renamed the Royal India Military College. Colloquially, it was known as Addiscombe Seminary, Addiscombe College, or Addiscombe Military Academy.

The Seminary was a sister institution to the East India Company College in Hertfordshire, which trained civilian "writers" (clerks). In military terms it was a counterpart to the Royal Military Academy at Woolwich and the Royal Military College at Sandhurst.

History

Addiscombe Place
Addiscombe Place, the mansion house which formed the central building of the later Seminary, was erected in about 1702 by William Draper, on land which he had inherited in 1700 from his aunt, Dame Sarah Temple. Draper's father-in-law was the diarist John Evelyn, who in 1703 pronounced the house "in all points of good and solid architecture to be one of the very best gentleman's houses in Surrey, when finish'd". Its interior included many mural paintings of mythological subjects, supposed to be the work of Sir James Thornhill; while high up on the exterior east front was carved the Latin inscription, Non faciam vitio culpave minorem ("I will not lower myself by vice or fault"). By the late 18th century the house was in the ownership of Charles James Clarke, who leased it to the statesman Charles Jenkinson, Lord Hawkesbury, later 1st Earl of Liverpool. Regular visitors during Liverpool's tenure included King George III and William Pitt.

The military seminary
Following the death of Lord Liverpool in December 1808, Addiscombe Place was put on the market by Emelius Delmé-Radcliffe (Clarke's brother-in-law). It was bought by the Court of Directors of the East India Company for use as a military academy. Although the company was primarily a trading concern, it also maintained its own army, the officers of which had previously been trained at the Royal Military Academy, Woolwich, at the Royal Military College Junior Department at Great Marlow, or privately. They were now to be trained at Addiscombe. The Seminary opened on 21 January 1809, although the formal transfer of title of the property did not take place until a year later, on 26 January 1810.

The initial purchase comprised the mansion house and 58 acres of land to the south of Lower Addiscombe Road, but a further 30 acres to the north were subsequently acquired. New buildings were added, so that the mansion house, which originally housed the entire establishment, became a purely administrative block. The additions included barracks, a chapel, a drawing and lecture hall, a hospital, a dining-hall, a sand-modelling hall, a gymnasium, and service facilities including a bakehouse, dairy, laundry, and brew-house.

Cadets and the curriculum
In the early days cadets entered the Seminary between the ages of 13 and 16, and later between 15 and 18. They normally remained for 2 years (4 terms), although it was possible to pass the final examination within a shorter period. The initial intake comprised 60 cadets, but numbers rose to about 75 a year, meaning that there were around 150 cadets in residence at any one time. Cadets or their families were required to pay fees (£30 a year when the Seminary first opened; £50 a term by 1835), but these were heavily subsidised and represented only a proportion of the true costs of their education.

Initially, the main purpose of the Seminary was to train cadets for the Engineer or Artillery arms of the service, but as an experiment in 1816–17, and more permanently from 1827, "general service" cadets destined for the Infantry were admitted. In all, some 3,600 cadets passed through Addiscombe during the years of its existence. Of these, over 500 entered the Engineers, nearly 1,100 the Artillery, and about 2,000 the Infantry, some of whom subsequently transferred to the Cavalry.

The curriculum comprised instruction in the "sciences of Mathematics, Fortification, Natural Philosophy, and Chemistry; the Hindustani, Latin, and French languages; in the art of Civil, Military, and Lithographic Drawing and Surveying; and in the construction of the several gun-carriages and mortar-beds used in the Artillery service, from the most approved models". The Company paid well, and attracted some distinguished academic staff: John Shakespear published a standard Hindustani grammar, and Jonathan Cape was a Fellow of the Royal Society. In practice, the emphasis was on mathematics, and the Seminary was criticised for not including more training in practical "military science". In the 1850s photography was also studied. J. M. Bourne concludes that the Seminary was "not a true military college at all, but a militarised public school"although he also judges that, by the standards of the age, its record as a military training school was not significantly worse than those of the establishments at Woolwich and Sandhurst.

Cadets were required to wear uniforms at all times, and were not permitted to go beyond the grounds or into Croydon without permission. However, they gained a reputation for indiscipline, and fights with the townspeople of Croydon were not infrequent. There was no corporal punishment, but in the early years cadets could be punished by being incarcerated in the so-called "Black Hole", and fed on bread and water. Until 1829 they worshipped regularly at Croydon Parish Church (marching there each Sunday in uniform, accompanied by their band): after that date they began to worship at the newly consecrated St James's Church, Addiscombe.

Public Examinations and Pollock Medal
Examinations were held twice-yearly in June and December: they lasted about three weeks, and culminated in a Public Examination, a day-long affair of some ceremony before a distinguished invited audience, which included orchestrated demonstrations of book-learning and of military exercises such as swordsmanship and pontoon-building; an exhibition of drawings and models; a formal inspection; and the distribution of prizes. The day's events are described in one account as "a performance carefully prepared and rehearsed beforehand. Its object was to make a favourable impression on a carefully selected audience". The Public Examiner, who presided, was an eminent general (see list below); while the audience usually included some of the Directors of the East India Company, and often the Archbishop of Canterbury, who had a residence nearby at Addington Palace.

In 1848 the Seminary began awarding the Pollock Medal to the best cadet of the training season. The award was named after Field Marshal Sir George Pollock. The Pollock Prize was transferred to the Royal Military Academy, Woolwich after Addiscombe was closed.

Closure and development of the site
Following the Indian Rebellion of 1857, the East India Company was wound up in 1858. The college passed into government hands, becoming known as the Royal Indian Military College, Addiscombe, but continued to perform much the same function. With the amalgamation of the Royal and Indian services in 1861, there was initially a proposal that Addiscombe should be retained as a military college. However, the War Office decided that the establishments at Woolwich and Sandhurst were sufficient for their needs, and the college closed in June the same year.

The site was sold on 30 August 1861 for £33,600 to the British Land Company, who demolished most of the buildings. All that remain are two former professors' houses, "Ashleigh" and "India", on the corner of Clyde Road and Addiscombe Road; and the former gymnasium on Havelock Road, now private apartments. The Land Company laid out five parallel roads over the greater part of the grounds, and built them up with villas. The five roadsOutram, Havelock, Elgin, Clyde and Canning Roadsall took their names from soldiers and politicians prominent on the British side in the events of 1857–58, although none was in fact a college alumnus.

Headship
1809–22: James Andrew, styled Superintendent and Head Master
1822–24: Henry Carmichael-Smyth, styled Resident Superintendent (this appointment was regarded as temporary)
1824–34: Sir Robert Houston, styled Lieutenant-Governor
1834–50: Sir Ephraim Stannus, styled Lieutenant-Governor
1851–60: Sir Frederick Abbott, styled Lieutenant-Governor

Notable cadets
Notable cadets include:

1810s

 Augustus Abbott
 Sir Proby Cautley 
 John Colvin 
 Sir Arthur Cotton
 Sir Frederick Lester
 Sir George Lawrence
 James Oliphant
 Charles Waddington
 Sir Archdale Wilson, Bt

1820s

 Sir Frederick Abbott
 Herbert Edward Stacy Abbott 
 Sir James Abbott
 Saunders Alexius Abbott
 Sir William Erskine Baker
 John Archibald Ballard
 Arthur Conolly 
 Sir Alexander Cunningham
 Sir Henry Marion Durand
 Vincent Eyre
 Hugh Fraser
 William Cornwallis Harris
 John Jacob
 Sir Atwell Lake
 Sir Henry Lawrence
 Sir Robert Montgomery
 Robert Napier, 1st Baron Napier of Magdala 
 Sir Thomas Townsend Pears
 Eldred Pottinger
 Bradshaw Reilly
 Sir Richmond Shakespear
 Sir Andrew Scott Waugh

1830s

 Sir Orfeur Cavenagh
 Douglas Hamilton
 Sir Arnold Burrowes Kemball
 Sir George Malcolm
 Sir William Olpherts VC
 Sir Frederick Pollock
 Joseph Medlicott Scriven
 Richard Baird Smith
 Sir Richard Strachey
 Henry Ravenshaw Thuillier
 Sir Henry Tombs VC
 James Travers VC
 Sir Henry Yule

1840s

 Sir George Tomkyns Chesney
 Sir Peter Lumsden
 Donald Macintyre VC
 James John McLeod Innes VC
 James Rose, 23rd of Kilravock
 Sir John Carstairs McNeill VC
 Thomas George Montgomerie
 Sir Francis Norman
 Sir Lambert Playfair
 George Alexander Renny VC
 Sir Richard Sankey
 James Francis Tennant
 George Dobson Willoughby

1850s

 Sir Charles Bernard
 Sir James Browne
 Thomas Tupper Carter-Campbell of Possil
 John Underwood Champain
 Sir Henry Collett
 James Dundas VC
 William Wilberforce Harris Greathed
 Frederick Edward Hadow 
 Sir James Hills-Johnes VC
 Sir Samuel Swinton Jacob
 William Merriman
 Sir Charles Nairne
 John Pennycuick
 Sir Harry Prendergast VC
 Lord Roberts of Kabul and Kandahar VC
 Sir Oliver St John
 Sir Edward Talbot Thackeray VC
 Sir Henry Trotter
 Francis Ward

1860s

 Sir Bindon Blood
 Sir Arthur George Hammond VC
 Sir Albert Hime
 Sir John Frederick Maurice
 Thomas Price
 Sir Edward Stedman
 Sir Robert Warburton

Notable staff

Staff at Addiscombe included:
 Sir Frederick Abbott, Lieutenant-Governor 1851–61
 Dr James Andrew, Superintendent 1809–22
 David T. Ansted, Lecturer in Geology 1845–61
 John Callow, Lecturer in Civil Drawing 1855–61
 Revd Jonathan Cape, Senior Professor of Mathematics 1822–61
 John Frederic Daniell, Professor of Chemistry 1835–45
 Theodore Henry Adolphus Fielding, Lecturer in Civil Drawing 1826–50
 Edward Frankland, Professor of Chemistry 1859–61
 John Christian Schetky, Lecturer in Civil Drawing 1836–55
 John Shakespear, Professor of Hindustani, 1809–29
 William Sturgeon, Lecturer in Science and Philosophy 1824–50
 William Frederick Wells, Lecturer in Civil Drawing 1813–36

Public Examiners
The Public Examiners were:
 1809–20: Maj-Gen. William Mudge
 1820–23: Maj-Gen. Sir Howard Douglas
 1824–40: Maj-Gen. Sir Alexander Dickson
 1840–55: Maj-Gen. Charles Pasley
 1856–61: Maj-Gen. Sir Frederick Smith

References

Bibliography

 (mainly on Addiscombe Place)

External links
 (based on Vibart 1894)

Educational institutions established in 1809
Training establishments of the British Army
19th century in London
History of the London Borough of Croydon
Military history of London
British East India Company
Military academies of the United Kingdom
Properties of the East India Company
 
1809 establishments in the United Kingdom
1861 disestablishments in England